Robert Lawrence Leonard (born February 28, 1969), known by his stage name Robert Sean Leonard, is an American actor. He is best known for playing Dr. James Wilson in the television series House (2004–2012) and Neil Perry in the film Dead Poets Society. 

Leonard won a Tony Award for Best Featured Actor in a Play for his performance in The Invention of Love in 2001. His other theater credits include Candida, Long Day's Journey Into Night, Breaking the Code, The Speed of Darkness, Philadelphia, Here I Come!, Arcadia, The Music Man, Born Yesterday, Fifth of July, and To Kill a Mockingbird. 

From 2013 to 2014, Leonard had a recurring role as Dr. Roger Kadar on the television series Falling Skies. He also starred as the leading role in Swing Kids playing Peter Müller.

Early life and education
Leonard grew up in Ridgewood, New Jersey, where he graduated from Ridgewood High School. He studied at Fordham University and later the Columbia University School of General Studies. He studied theater at HB Studio.

Career
Because he shares his birth name with another actor, Leonard modified his name for his Screen Actors Guild membership, using "Sean", the name of his brother, as a middle name.

Leonard is a three-time Tony Award nominee, and won Best Featured Actor in a Play in 2001 for his role as A. E. Housman in Tom Stoppard's The Invention of Love. He had previously played the role of Valentine in the New York premiere of Stoppard's Arcadia at Lincoln Center in 1995. He was nominated for a Tony in 2003 for his portrayal of Edmund Tyrone in a well-received revival of Eugene O'Neill's Long Day's Journey Into Night; it co-starred Philip Seymour Hoffman, Brian Dennehy, and Vanessa Redgrave. Leonard has also appeared in Broadway musical productions, in 2001 replacing Craig Bierko as the lead performer in a revival of The Music Man. Leonard co-starred as Paul Verrall in the 2011 Broadway revival of Born Yesterday.

In 1997, Leonard received rave reviews for his role in the television film In the Gloaming, directed by Christopher Reeve. Entertainment Weekly said that Leonard "does a first-rate job of juggling Danny's mixture of despair, neediness, and mordant jokiness."

From 2004, he played Dr. James Wilson, head of the oncology department, on the FOX TV series House, until the series ended in 2012. In 2007 Leonard appeared on Entertainment Weeklys 100 list as "Dr. Underrated".

In 2016, Leonard played King Arthur in David Lee's adaptation of the musical Camelot at the Westport Country Playhouse in Westport, Connecticut. From February to April 2017, he appeared in the Broadway revival of Sunday in the Park with George, as Jules/Bob.

Personal life
Leonard maintains a close friendship with House co-star Hugh Laurie. He and Ethan Hawke, his costar in Dead Poets Society and Tape, have been friends since childhood. Hawke and Leonard founded the Malaparte theater company, along with James Waterston, Steve Zahn, and Frank Whaley. 

In 2008, Leonard married Gabriella Salick. The couple have two daughters.

Filmography

Film

Television

Theatre

Awards and nominations
 Awards
 2001: Tony Award for Best Performance by a Featured Actor in a Play – The Invention of Love

Nominations
 1990: Chicago Film Critics Association for Most Promising Actor – Dead Poets Society
 1993: Tony Award for Best Performance by a Featured Actor in a Play – Candida
 1997: Online Film & Television Association for Best Actor in a Motion Picture or Miniseries – In the Gloaming
 2003: Tony Award for Best Performance by a Featured Actor in a Play – Long Day's Journey into Night
 2009: Screen Actors Guild Award for Outstanding Performance by an Ensemble in a Drama Series – House, M.D.
 2011: People's Choice Award for Favorite TV Doctor – House, M.D.

References

External links

 
 
 

1969 births
Male actors from New Jersey
American male film actors
American male stage actors
American male television actors
Columbia University School of General Studies alumni
Fordham University alumni
Living people
People from Ridgewood, New Jersey
Ridgewood High School (New Jersey) alumni
People from Westwood, New Jersey
Tony Award winners
20th-century American male actors
21st-century American male actors